Peter MacGregor Chalmers LLD (14 March 1859 – 15 March 1922) was a Scottish architect specialising in country churches, and also being involved in several important restoration schemes.

Life

Chalmers was born on 14 March 1859, the son of George, a mechanical engineer, and his wife, Jane (née MacGregor). He was educated at Glasgow Secular School, then articled to the architect John Honeyman. He set up in private practice from 1887.

From around 1900 many of his churches adopt a very distinctive circular tower.

In 1904 he was living at 6 Minard Road (now Turnberry Road) in Glasgow. The property is a substantial four-bedroom tenement flat, in Glasgow's west end. His offices were in a more prestigious property at 95 Bath Street.
He travelled very widely, and Glasgow University awarded him an honorary doctorate (LLD) in 1920 for his writings.

He died of a heart attack while visiting his cousin, Rev. R. H. Fisher, in Edinburgh on 15 March 1922.  He is buried in the lower southern section of the Glasgow Necropolis alongside the north-east path that leads to the main, upper section.

Family
In 1905 he was married to Barbara Greig Steel (1860–1939) of Partick.

Principal works

War memorials
Chalmers designed several war memorials from 1919, these include: Cambuslang Parish Church; Morebattle Parish Church; Burntisland Parish Church; Kelvinside Free Church; Memorial Chapel in St Cuthbert's Church, Edinburgh; West Linton Parish Church; Abbey Parish Church in Kilwinning; Barony Church, Glasgow; Memorial arch in Dyke, Moray; Rosneath Church; St Salvator's College, St Andrews; Crieff; Memorial window Uphall.

Gallery

Publications

Glasgow Cathedral
John Morro, A Scots Medieval Architect
St Ninians Candid Casa
The Govan Sarcophagus
Dalmeny Kirk
The Shrine of St Constantine
The Shrines of St Margaret and St Kentigern

References

1859 births
1922 deaths
Scottish ecclesiastical architects
Scottish non-fiction writers
Architects from Glasgow